Pedro de Mata y Haro, C.R. (1576–1627) was a Roman Catholic prelate who served as Bishop of Capaccio (1611–1627) and Bishop of Belcastro (1609–1611).

Biography
Pedro de Mata y Haro was born in Naples, Italy in 1576 and ordained a priest in the Congregation of Clerics Regular of the Divine Providence.
On 3 August 1609, he was appointed during the papacy of Pope Paul V as Bishop of Belcastro.
On 5 August 1609, he was consecrated bishop by Giambattista Leni, Bishop of Mileto, with Giovanni Battista del Tufo, Bishop Emeritus of Acerra, and Giovanni Vitelli, Bishop of Carinola, serving as co-consecrators. 
On 28 February 1611, he was appointed during the papacy of Pope Paul V as Bishop of Capaccio.
He served as Bishop of Capaccio until his death on 3 March 1627.

While bishop, he was the principal co-consecrator of Manuel Esteban Muniera, Bishop of Cefalù (1621).

References

External links and additional sources
 (for Chronology of Bishops) 
 (for Chronology of Bishops) 
 (for Chronology of Bishops) 
 (for Chronology of Bishops) 

17th-century Italian Roman Catholic bishops
Bishops appointed by Pope Paul V
1576 births
1627 deaths
Clergy from Naples
Theatine bishops